The 772nd Expeditionary Airlift Squadron is a provisional United States Air Force unit, assigned to Air Combat Command to activate or inactivate as needed.   It is deployed with the 451st Air Expeditionary Wing at Kandahar Airfield, Afghanistan.

The squadron was first activated as the 772nd Bombardment Squadron during World War II.  After training in the United States with Boeing B-17 Flying Fortress heavy bombers, it deployed to the Mediterranean Theater of Operations, where it participated in the strategic bombing campaign against Germany, earning two Distinguished Unit Citations before inactivating in Italy.

The squadron was redesignated the 772nd Troop Carrier Squadron and activated in January 1953, when it assumed the mission, personnel and aircraft of a reserve unit that had been called to active duty for the Korean War and was being released from active duty.  The squadron provided airlift during a number of contingency operations, and in 1968, moved to the Philippines, from which its crews and planes rotated to Vietnam to provide airlift support during the Vietnam War.  The squadron was reactivated in the United States, where it continued airlift operations until inactivating in 1993.  It was converted to provisional status in 2001.

Mission
The squadron provides airlift to forces engaged in the Global War on Terrorism.  It performs airlift, airdrop, and aeromedical evacuation support for theater forces.

History

World War II

Training in the United States
The squadron was first activated as the 772nd Bombardment Squadron at Geiger Field, Washington on 1 August 1943 as one of the four original squadrons of the 463d Bombardment Group.  The 772nd moved to Rapid City Army Air Base, South Dakota, where it received its initial cadre.  On 1 September, the key personnel of the squadron and 463d Group moved to Orlando Army Air Base, where they participated in advanced tactical training with the Army Air Forces School of Applied Tactics.  A model crew from the squadron moved to Montbrook Army Air Field to participate in simulated missions with a Boeing B-17 Flying Fortress.  The cadre returned to Rapid City at the end of the month, where the ground echelon of the squadron was filled out and ground school begun.

The squadron moved to MacDill Field, Florida in November and began flight training with the Flying Fortress, although its air echelon was not fully manned until early December. on 2 February, the squadron's ground echelon departed Florida for the port of embarkation at Camp Patrick Henry, Virginia, for shipment to the Mediterranean Theater of Operations, while the air echelon ferried their B-17s via the southern ferry route.

Combat in the Mediterranean Theater

The squadron arrived in Italy in March 1944 and flew its first combat mission from Celone Airfield on 30 March against an airfield at Imotski, Yugoslavia.  It engaged primarily in the strategic bombing campaign against Germany. It attacked targets like marshalling yards, oil refineries and aircraft factories in Austria, Czechoslovakia, Germany, Greece, Romania and Yugoslavia.  The squadron was awarded a Distinguished Unit Citation (DUC) for a mission against oil refineries in Ploesti, Romania on 18 May 1944. Clouds that obscured the target resulted in Fifteenth Air Force recalling the mission, but the squadron and the rest of the 463d Group did not receive the recall message and was the only unit to continue on, causing major destruction to the target.  Although crippled by intense fighter attacks, the unit also inflicted severe damage on the opposing air defenses.  On 24 May 1944, the 463d Group led the 5th Bombardment Wing in an attack against a Daimler-Benz tank factory at Berlin, Germany.  The squadron made a successful attack despite three separate attacks by enemy air defenses, including attacks by German jet fighters.  This action earned the squadron its second DUC.

The squadron was occasionally diverted from its strategic mission to perform air support and air interdiction missions.  In May and June 1944, it bombed bridges to support the campaign for the liberation of Rome.  In August 1944, it struck bridges, gun positions and other targets to support Operation Dragoon, the invasion of southern France.  It hit military airbases, bridges and other tactical targets to support partisan forces and the Red Army advance in the Balkans.  During the last months of the war the squadron operated primarily to support Operation Grapeshot, the spring 1945 offensive in Northern Italy.

The squadron flew its final combat mission on 26 April 1945.  After V-E Day the squadron transported personnel (primarily soldiers of Fifth Army) from Italy to Casablanca for return to the United States.  By early September, the unit had been substantially reduced by transfers to other units and returns of personnel to the United States and it was inactivated in Italy with the end of Project Green in September 1945.

Airlift operations

Activation and move to Ardmore

The squadron was redesignated the 772nd Troop Carrier Squadron and activated at Memphis Municipal Airport, Tennessee on 16 January 1953.  At Memphis, it absorbed the mission, personnel and Fairchild C-119 Flying Boxcars of the 345th Troop Carrier Squadron, a reserve unit that had been mobilized for the Korean War and was being returned to the reserves.  In August, the squadron departed the civilian airfield at Memphis for the newly reopened Ardmore Air Force Base, Oklahoma.

The squadron airlifted equipment and supplies and supported Army airborne exercises.  The squadron became one of the first to equip with the new Lockheed C-130A Hercules in 1956.  In September 1957, Tactical Air Command (TAC) converted the 463d Wing to the dual deputy system.   The 463d Group was inactivated, and the squadron was assigned directly to the 463d Troop Carrier Wing.

In July 1958, president Camille Chamoun of Lebanon was facing an insurgency against his government and requested military assistance from the United States, which implemented Operation Blue Bat.  The squadron, along with other elements of the 463d Wing, flew command elements of Nineteenth Air Force and other personnel and equipment of the Composite Air Strike Force to locations in the Middle East. The following month, the squadron provided airlift for the 1958 Taiwan Strait Crisis.

Operations from Sewart and Langley
Although Ardmore had only been open for six years, the Air Force decided to close the base again.  The inactivation of the 513th Troop Carrier Wing, a Fairchild C-123 Provider unit at Sewart Air Force Base, Tennessee, provided room for the 772nd and the other operational units of the 463d Wing to move there.  The squadron moved to Sewart in November 1958, and soon began replacing its C-130As with C-130B models.  While at Sewart, the squadron provided airlift support during the Berlin Crisis of 1961.  The squadron was again called on to provide emergency airlift support during the Cuban Missile Crisis in October and November 1962, transporting TAC support forces and materiel to Florida, Army units to stations in the southeastern United States and Marine reinforcements to Guantánamo Bay.

In July 1962, TAC established a Combat Crew Training School at Sewart.  Starting with a single squadron, by the spring of 1963, the school had expanded to a full wing, the 4442d Combat Crew Training Wing.  As a result of the expansion of the C-130 training unit, the 463d Wing, including the squadron, moved to Langley Air Force Base, Virginia in July 1963.  From Langley, the squadron deployed crews and planes to support the US response during the Gulf of Tonkin Incident in the late summer of 1964.  In late April 1965, the squadron participated in Operation Power Pack.  Following a military coup in the Dominican Republic, Nineteenth Air Force formed an airlift task force to airlift the 82nd Airborne Division.  On 28 and 29 April, the squadron flew C-130s to Pope Air Force Base to join the task force to transport elements of the 82nd Division to San Isidro Air Base.  By September, peacekeeping functions had been transferred to Latin American countries' forces and the squadron helped return American forces to the United States.

Vietnam War

While participating in Power Pack, the squadron was also deploying forces to airlift men and material to Southeast Asia.  In November 1965, the 463d Wing moved to Mactan Island Airfield, in the Philippines to provide this support full-time.  The squadron was the last element of the wing to move, remaining at Langley, where it was briefly assigned to the 840th Air Division until February 1966, when it joined the wing in the Philippines.
  
The squadron deployed crews and planes operating combat airlift missions in Vietnam under the operational control of the 315th Air Division.  The squadron also flew aeromedical evacuation missions.  In August 1967, the squadron became the 772nd Tactical Airlift Squadron, and in July 1968, it moved from Mactan to Clark Air Base.  The 772nd became nonoperational at the beginning of June 1971 and was inactivated on 15 June.

Operations from Dyess
Just under a year later, on 1 June 1972, the squadron was reactivated at Dyess Air Force Base, Texas, when it absorbed the personnel, equipment and mission of the 347th Tactical Airlift Squadron, which was inactivated. The squadron deployed as a unit frequently to Europe, where it came under the operational control of the 513th Tactical Airlift Wing in England or the 322d Tactical Airlift Wing in Germany, and later the 313th Tactical Airlift Group.  It also deployed less frequently to the Pacific where it was controlled by the 374th Tactical Airlift Wing.  The squadron flew humanitarian missions and participated in exercises.  In November 1991, the squadron was assigned to the 463d Operations Group and redesignated the 772nd Airlift Squadron with the implementation of the Objective Wing organization at Dyess.  The squadron was inactivated and its personnel and equipment were transferred to the 39th Airlift Squadron on 1 October 1993, when all operational units at Dyess became part of the 7th Wing.

Expeditionary operations
The squadron was converted to provisional status as the 772nd Expeditionary Airlift Squadron in 2001 and assigned to Air Combat Command to activate or inactivate as needed.  It has been active at Kandahar Airfield, Afghanistan, operating with C-130Js and aircrews deployed from active, reserve, and Air National Guard units.  The squadron was responsible for the majority of airlift missions in Afghanistan in the early 2010s, averaging 50 sorties a day and regularly setting records for the most airdrops in a month.   In April 2013, the squadron was the first Air Force unit to make an airdrop using the Extracted Container Delivery System, a system that pulls bundles out of the aircraft at a faster rate than the earlier airdrop process, which improves the overall accuracy of the drop itself.

Lineage
 Constituted as the 772d Bombardment Squadron (Heavy) on 19 May 1943
 Activated on 1 August 1943
 Redesignated 772d Bombardment Squadron, Heavy c. 29 September 1944
 Inactivated on 25 September 1945
 Redesignated 772d Troop Carrier Squadron, Medium on 1 December 1952
 Activated on 16 January 1953
 Redesignated: 772d Troop Carrier Squadron, Assault on 18 December 1961
 Redesignated: 772d Troop Carrier Squadron, Medium on 15 May 1965
 Redesignated: 772d Troop Carrier Squadron on 1 January 1967
 Redesignated: 772d Tactical Airlift Squadron on 1 August 1967
 Inactivated on 15 June 1971
 Activated on 1 June 1972
 Redesignated 772d Airlift Squadron on 1 November 1991
 Inactivated on 1 October 1993
 Redesignated 772d Expeditionary Airlift Squadron and converted to provisional status on 4 December 2001
 Activated by 1 March 2002
 Inactivated after 31 May 2003
 Activated 2009

Assignments
 463d Bombardment Group, 1 August 1943 – 25 September 1945
 463d Troop Carrier Group, 16 January 1953
 463d Troop Carrier Wing, 25 September 1957
 840th Air Division, 23 November 1965
 463d Troop Carrier Wing (later 463d Tactical Airlift Wing), 7 February 1966 – 15 June 1971
 463d Tactical Airlift Wing, 1 June 1972
 Attached to: 513th Tactical Airlift Wing, 9 July–15 September 1972 and 10 November 1972 – 10 January 1973, 5 January–15 March 1975 and 3 November 1975 – 15 January 1976; 374th Tactical Airlift Wing, 6 May–4 June 1973; 322d Tactical Airlift Wing, 5 February–8 April 1974, 3 August–15 October 1976; 313th Tactical Airlift Group, 3 November 1977 – 7 January 1978, 3 April–5 June 1979, 3 August–5 October 1980, 3 December 1981 – 13 February 1982, 4 April–7 June 1983; 5 June–4 August 1984; 10 October–7 December 1985, 4 June–12 August 1987, 4 August–13 October 1988, and 4 October–12 December 1989
 463d Operations Group, 1 November 1991 – 1 October 1993
 Air Combat Command to activate or inactivate at any time after 4 December 2001
 Unknown 1 March 2002 – 31 May 2003
 451st Air Expeditionary Wing, 2009 – present

Stations

 Geiger Field, Washington, 1 August 1943
 Rapid City Army Air Base, South Dakota, August 1943
 MacDill Field, Florida, 4 November 1943
 Drane Field, Florida, 3 January–2 February 1944
 Morrison Field, Florida, 11–14 February 1944
 Celone Airfield, Italy, 11 March 1944
 Pomigliano Airfield, Italy, 26 May 1945
 Celone Airfield, Italy, 3–25 September 1945
 Memphis Municipal Airport, Tennessee, 16 January 1953
 Ardmore Air Force Base, Oklahoma, 17 August 1953
 Sewart Air Force Base, Tennessee, 15 November 1958
 Langley Air Force Base, Virginia, 5 July 1963 – 7 February 1966
 Mactan Island Airfield, Philippines, 12 February 1966
 Clark Air Base, Philippines, 15 July 1968 – 15 June 1971
 Dyess Air Force Base, Texas, 1 June 1972 – 1 October 1993
 Deployed to RAF Mildenhall, England, 9 July–15 September 1972, 10 November 1972 – 10 January 1973, 5 January–15 March 1975, 3 November 1975 – 15 January 1976, 3 November 1977 – 7 January 1978, 3 April–5 June 1979, 3 August–5 October 1980, 3 December 1981 – 13 February 1982, 4 April–7 June 1983, 5 June–4 August 1984, 10 October–7 December 1985, 4 June–12 August 1987, and 4 October–12 December 1989; Ching Chuan Kang Air Base, Taiwan, 6 May–4 June 1973; Rhein Main Air Base, West Germany, 5 February–8 April 1974, 3 August–15 October 1976; RAF Sculthorpe, England, 4 August – 13 October 1988
 Unknown 1 March 2002 – 31 May 2003
 Kandahar Airfield, Afghanistan, 2009 – present

Aircraft
 Boeing B-17 Flying Fortress, 1943–1945
 Fairchild C-119 Flying Boxcar, 1953–1957
 Lockheed C-130 Hercules, 1956–1971; 1972–1993, 2002–2003; 2009–present

Awards and campaigns

See also

 Boeing B-17 Flying Fortress Units of the Mediterranean Theater of Operations
 List of C-130 Hercules operators

References

Notes
 Explanatory notes

 Citations

Bibliography

 
 
 *

External links
 

Airlift squadrons of the United States Air Force
Air expeditionary squadrons of the United States Air Force